Emil Fehr was a Swiss footballer who played for FC Basel as a goalkeeper.

Football career
Between the years 1913 and 1919 Fehr played a total of 8 games for Basel. Five of these games were in the Swiss Serie A and the other three were friendly games.

References

Sources
 Rotblau: Jahrbuch Saison 2017/2018. Publisher: FC Basel Marketing AG. 
 Die ersten 125 Jahre. Publisher: Josef Zindel im Friedrich Reinhardt Verlag, Basel. 
 Verein "Basler Fussballarchiv" Homepage

FC Basel players
Swiss men's footballers
Association football goalkeepers
Year of birth missing
Year of death missing